Seven of the top ten women on the WTA Tour will be playing the Qatar Telecom German Open from May 5 to May 11 of 2008, including world number one Justine Henin. World number 3, Maria Sharapova, along with Venus Williams and Daniela Hantuchová, ranked 8th and 10th respectively, are the only top 10 players not participating.

This was the last tournament in which Justine Henin participated in before announcing her sudden retirement a week after this tournament. She was defeated in the third round by the eventual champion Dinara Safina.

Ana Ivanovic was the defending champion, but she was defeated in the semi-finals by Elena Dementieva.

Seeds
The top 8 seeds received a bye into the second round.

Draw

Key
 Q = Qualifier
 WC = Wild card
 LL = Lucky loser
 r = Retired
 w/o = Walkover

Finals

Top half

Section 1

Section 2

Bottom half

Section 3

Section 4

References

External links
 Official results archive (ITF)
 Official results archive (WTA)

Qatar Telecom German Open
2008 Singles